PA21 may refer to:
 Pennsylvania Route 21
 Pennsylvania's 21st congressional district
 Piper PA-21, an aircraft prototype
 Pitcairn PA-21, an autogyro of the 1930s